The Incorporated Law Society of Northern Ireland, commonly known as the Law Society of Northern Ireland, is a professional body established by Royal Charter granted on 10 July 1922 and whose powers and duties are to regulate the solicitors' profession in Northern Ireland with the aim of protecting the public. It is headquartered in Belfast, Northern Ireland's capital city.

Under the Solicitors (Northern Ireland) Order 1976, the Law Society acts as the regulatory authority governing the education, accounts, discipline and professional conduct of solicitors in order to maintain the independence, ethical standards, professional competence and quality of services offered to the public.

Relationship with the Law Society of Ireland
Prior to the partition of Ireland, solicitors in what became Northern Ireland were regulated by the Law Society of Ireland.

Northern Ireland-qualified solicitors are entitled to apply to the Law Society of Ireland to be admitted to the Roll of Solicitors in the Republic of Ireland without taking any further examinations. Republic of Ireland-qualified solicitors have a reciprocal eligibility.

History

The Law Society of Ireland was established on 24 June 1830 with premises at Inns Quay, Dublin. In November 1830, the committee of the Society submitted a memorial to the benchers as to the ‘necessity and propriety’ of erecting chambers for the use of solicitors with the funds that solicitors had been levied to pay to King's Inns over the years. The committee requested that the hall and chambers for the use of solicitors should be erected away from the King's Inns, and apartments in the Four Courts were allotted by the King's Inns to solicitors in May 1841. However, the adequacy of that accommodation at the Four Courts was to be a bone of contention between the Society and the benchers for 30 years. The first president, Josiah Dunn, was elected in 1842. In accordance with the Supreme Court of Judicature Act (Ireland) 1877, anyone admitted as solicitors or attorneys were, from then on, to be referred to as solicitors of the Court of Judicature (although the title of attorney lives on in the designation of the chief law officer of Northern Ireland as the Attorney General).

Following the partition of Ireland, the separate Law Society of Northern Ireland was established on 10 July 1922.

Functions

The Law Society has a range of statutory and non-statutory functions. Under the Solicitors (Northern Ireland) Order 1976, the Law Society acts as the regulatory authority governing the education, accounts, discipline and professional conduct of solicitors in order to maintain the independence, ethical standards, professional competence and quality of services offered to the public. The Law Society's non-statutory functions relate to the representation and provision of services to its members and protecting the public interest.

Education

Solicitors in Northern Ireland are trained at the Institute of Professional Legal Studies at Queen's University Belfast.

Administration

The Law Society operates through an elected Council of 30 members, all practising solicitors, who serve on a voluntary basis. The Council is guided by the Presidential and Chief Executive Team which consists of the President, Senior Vice President, Junior President and Chief Executive.

Past Presidents 

 2005 – Attracta Wilson
 2006 – Rory McShane
 2007 – James Cooper
 2008 – Donald Eakin
 2009 – Barry Finlay
 2010 – Norville Connolly
 2011 – Brian Speers
 2012 – Imelda McMillan
 2013 – Michael Robinson
 2014 – Richard Palmer
 2015 – Arleen Elliott
 2016 – John Guerin
 2017 – Ian Huddleston
 2018 – Eileen Ewing
 2019 – Suzanne Rice
 2020 – Rowan White
 2021 – Rowan White
 2022 – Brigid Napier

See also
Law Society of Ireland, the professional association for solicitors in the Republic of Ireland
Bar of Northern Ireland, the professional association for barristers in Northern Ireland

References

Sources

External links
 Official website

Northern Ireland, Law Society of
Bar associations of Europe
Legal organisations based in the United Kingdom
Legal organisations based in Ireland
Regulators of Northern Ireland
Organizations established in 1922
1922 establishments in Northern Ireland
Org
Professional associations based in Ireland